Mitten in Europa – Deutsche Geschichte is a German television series.

See also
List of German television series

External links
 

1989 German television series debuts
1990 German television series endings
German documentary television series
German-language television shows
Sat.1 original programming